Newton Chandler (19 September 1893 – 24 March 1997) was an Australian rules footballer who played with Carlton in the Victorian Football League (VFL) from 1919 until 1924.

Biography
Chandler was a member of the Brunswick Football Club prior to being recruited to Carlton at the age of 19, but his debut for the team was delayed by the onset of World War I. He played a total of 69 games, including the 1921 VFL Grand Final, where his team lost to Richmond. After retiring from active competition in 1924, he served as the club's Secretary (1934–1939, 1956), Vice-President (1940–1943), and Treasurer (1944–1958). His long life — he lived to the age of 103 — and dedication to the club earned him the nickname "The Grand Old Man of Carlton".

References

1893 births
1997 deaths
Australian centenarians
Men centenarians
Carlton Football Club players
Brunswick Football Club players
Australian rules footballers from Victoria (Australia)
People from Euroa
Carlton Football Club administrators